"L'Empereur, sa femme et le petit prince" is a French folk song of the second half of the 19th century, making a reference to Napoleon III, Empress Eugénie and the Prince impérial.

It is also known with the lyrics "le roi, la reine et le petit prince" (the king, the queen, and the little prince) and "Puisque c'est comme ça" rather than "Puisque c'est ainsi" (both "because it's like this" or "since this is how it is").

This song is used to teach the days of the week to children in French.

Lyrics 
1Lundi matin,
L’empereur, sa femme et le p’tit prince
Sont venus chez moi, pour me serrer la pince.
Comme j’étais parti,
Le p’tit prince a dit :
« Puisque c’est ainsi, nous reviendrons mardi. »
2Mardi matin,
L’empereur, sa femme et le p’tit prince
Sont venus chez moi, pour me serrer la pince.
Comme j’étais parti,
Le p’tit prince a dit :
« Puisque c’est ainsi, nous reviendrons mercredi. »
3Mercredi matin,
L’empereur, sa femme et le p’tit prince
Sont venus chez moi, pour me serrer la pince.
Comme j’étais parti,
Le p’tit prince a dit :
« Puisque c’est ainsi, nous reviendrons jeudi. »
4Jeudi matin,
L’empereur, sa femme et le p’tit prince
Sont venus chez moi, pour me serrer la pince.
Comme j’étais parti,
Le p’tit prince a dit :
« Puisque c’est ainsi, nous reviendrons vendredi. »
5Vendredi matin,
L’empereur, sa femme et le p’tit prince
Sont venus chez moi, pour me serrer la pince.
Comme j’étais parti,
Le p’tit prince a dit :
« Puisque c’est ainsi, nous reviendrons samedi. »
6Samedi matin,
L’empereur, sa femme et le p’tit prince
Sont venus chez moi, pour me serrer la pince.
Comme j’étais parti,
Le p’tit prince a dit :
« Puisque c’est ainsi, nous reviendrons dimanche. »
7Dimanche matin,
L’empereur, sa femme et le p’tit prince
Sont venus chez moi, pour me serrer la pince.
Comme j’étais parti,
Le p’tit prince a dit :
« Puisque c’est ainsi, nous ne reviendrons plus. »

English translation 
Monday morning,
The emperor, his wife and the little prince
Came to my house, to shake my hand.
As I was gone,
The little prince said:
"Since that's how it is, we'll come back on Tuesday. "

Tuesday morning,
The emperor, his wife and the little prince
Came to my house, to shake my hand.
As I was gone,
The little prince said:
"Since that's how it is, we'll come back on Wednesday. "

Wednesday morning,
The emperor, his wife and the little prince
Came to my house, to shake my hand.
As I was gone,
The little prince said:
"Since that's how it is, we'll come back on Thursday. "

Thursday morning,
The emperor, his wife and the little prince
Came to my house, to shake my hand.
As I was gone,
The little prince said:
"Since that's how it is, we'll come back on Friday. "

Friday morning,
The emperor, his wife and the little prince
Came to my house, to shake my hand.
As I was gone,
The little prince said:
"Since that's how it is, we'll come back on Saturday. "

Saturday morning,
The emperor, his wife and the little prince
Came to my house, to shake my hand.
As I was gone,
The little prince said:
"Since that's how it is, we'll come back on Sunday. "

Sunday morning,
The emperor, his wife and the little prince
Came to my house, to shake my hand.
As I was gone,
The little prince said:
"Since that's how it is, we won't come back again."

References

External links 

  (video)

French children's songs
19th-century songs
Songs about royalty